Antonia Grietje "Tooske" Ragas-Breugem (born 3 June 1974), is a Dutch actress and television host. She played a stewardess in 06/05, a movie by Theo van Gogh about the murder of Pim Fortuyn. She was video jockey (VJ) at TMF Netherlands and presented two seasons of the Dutch and German version of Idols.

Early life
Breugem was born in Zwolle into a Dutch Reformed family, and has two elder brothers, Jaap and Jan-Pieter.

Career
Since her first appearance on television in 1995 on the Soundmixshow, Tooske's career showed a lot of aspects of the Dutch entertainment industry. She was Miss Overijssel, the province she hailed from, in 1996, placed fourth in the Miss Netherlands competition, and was singer in the group Bogy Bogy for two years. Later, she became VJ at TMF Netherlands and MTV, which she was from 1998 until 2002. In 2002, she switched to the larger television channels and became co-host of Idols Netherlands together with Reinout Oerlemans for two seasons at RTL4.

In 2005, Breugem switched from RTL to the Dutch public television broadcasting association AVRO where she presented the Junior Songfestival, the presentation of the Televisierring and Help, ik word vader! ("Help, I'm becoming a father"). Together with Marco Schreyl she presented the third and fourth season of Deutschland sucht den Superstar, the German Idols version.

In 2006, she switched again, and this time to the commercial broadcaster SBS, where she presented Je wordt bedankt ("Thanks!") in 2006 and Het beste idee van Nederland ("The best idea from the Netherlands") in 2007.

Tooske is also known in Germany, but although the Dutch know her as Tooske Breugem, by her maiden name, the Germans know her generally as Tooske Ragas, after her husband. Officially she uses Tooske Ragas-Breugem.

She appears in the 2022 film Het Feest van Tante Rita.

Personal life
On 3 June 2002, Breugem married American Keith Davis, but the couple split up in December 2003. On 25 June 2005, she married the Dutch actor Bastiaan Ragas, who was her co-star in the musical 3 Musketiers. On 13 February 2007, their first daughter was born. Their second daughter was born on 28 May 2008. The third daughter was born on 7 April 2010.

References

External links 
 

1974 births
Dutch actresses
Dutch game show hosts
Living people
People from Zwolle
Dutch women television presenters
RTL Group people
21st-century Dutch women